Stenostelma is a genus of plants in the family Apocynaceae, first described as a genus in 1894. It is native to South Africa.

Species
 Stenostelma capense Schltr. - Northern Cape Province
 Stenostelma carinatum (Schltr.) Bullock - KwaZulu-Natal 
 Stenostelma corniculatum (E. Mey.) Bullock - Eastern Cape Province
 Stenostelma umbelluliferum (Schltr.) Bester & Nicholas - Gauteng Province

formerly included
Stenostelma eminens (Harv.) Bullock, syn of  Asclepias eminens (Harv.) Schltr.

References

Asclepiadoideae
Apocynaceae genera
Flora of South Africa